Mohammad Fayyaz (born 19 October 1984) is a Pakistani first-class cricketer who played for Peshawar cricket team.

References

External links
 

1984 births
Living people
Pakistani cricketers
Peshawar cricketers
Pakistan Telecommunication Company Limited cricketers
Cricketers from Peshawar